IL-14 or IL 14 can refer to:
 Interleukin 14
 Illinois's 14th congressional district
 Illinois Route 14
 Ilyushin Il-14 - Soviet aircraft